Battle of the Brave is a 2004 historical romance directed by Jean Beaudin, written by Pierre Billon and starring Noémie Godin-Vigneau, David La Haye, Juliette Gosselin, Sébastien Huberdeau, Gérard Depardieu, Bianca Gervais, Irène Jacob, Pierre Lebeau, Vincent Pérez, Isabel Richer, Tim Roth, Jason Isaacs and Colm Meaney. Separate English and French language versions were shot simultaneously. The film cost , making it as of 2004, the most expensive ever made in Quebec.

Plot
Trapper Francois returns to his hometown to visit his father. Unfortunately his father has just died and Francois is clueless in regards to the business he just inherited. He trusts his father's lawyer will take care of everything including the claims of creditors who have demanded an investigation.

Like his friend Xavier before Francois soon develops a crush on Marie-Loup, the town's healer. He is delighted when he sees her protecting an Indian girl against a racist. Both share a deep sympathy for the local tribe and speak its language fluently. Unlike Xavier, who serves the local authorities, Francois is successful. But after he has become Marie-Loup's lover, he is forced to escape. Right now the local authorities have discovered illegal affairs of his recently inherited company and they hold him responsible.

Francois hides in the wood among friendly Indians and lets them deliver a letter to Marie-Loup. He is waiting for her to join him, so they can get away together. Unfortunately she cannot read and needs to ask the local priest what Francois has written. The priest tells Marie-Loup she had been forsaken by Francois and persuades her to marry Xavier. The desperate Marie-Loup complies with the ceremony but then refuses Xavier his conjugal rights.

After she has done so for weeks, Xavier visits Francois in his hideout. He blames his rival for his misfortune and following a fierce fight he leaves him for dead. On his return to Marie-Loup the still furious Xavier utters threats. He does not survive this day.

Xavier's comrades refuse to accept Xavier's death as an accident. Marie-Loup gets accused of murder and witchcraft. Francois fails to save her and only gets himself arrested. The British authorities, who have meanwhile taken over the formerly French colony, refrain from interfering in this matter for fear to rekindle hostilities.

Cast

See also
Nouvelle-France (soundtrack)

References

External links
 

2004 films
Culture of Quebec
2004 romantic drama films
English-language French films
Films directed by Jean Beaudin
Films set in Quebec
British romantic drama films
Films scored by Patrick Doyle
French multilingual films
British multilingual films
2004 multilingual films
French-language Canadian films
2000s British films